Mitla Zapotec, or Didxsaj, is an Oto-Manguean language of Oaxaca, Mexico.

Guelavia Zapotec is reported to be 75% intelligible, but the reverse is apparently not the case.

Phonetics, phonology, and orthography
Mitla Zapotec has the following consonants:

 Fortis: p, t, k, kw, s, ʃ, m:, n:, l:
 Lenis: b, d, g, gw, z, ʒ, m, n, l
 Neutral: ɾ [flap r], r [trill r], f, x, ʔ, h, w, y.

/f/ is rare in native words.

 Mitla Zapotec has six vowels: /a, æ, e, i, o, u/. The vowel /æ/ is written  in the practical orthography.

Vowels contrast in phonation, with a difference between modal phonation, breathy phonation, and creaky phonation.  For example
  [gi̤ts] 'paper'
  [bḛts] 'louse'

Noun morphology
Mitla Zapotec has little noun morphology.  Pluralization is indicated by a plural proclitic /re/, as in the following example

Alienably possessed nouns have a prefix ʃ- (spelled  in the popular orthography), as in the following examples (cited first in practical orthography, then in IPA).

Verb morphology

Aspectual morphology
Briggs analyses Mitla Zapotec as having six aspects, each of which has an ablative ('go and V') and non-ablative variant.  They are

 continuative, e.g.,  'to take'  'he continually takes'
 habitual, e.g.,  'to see'  'he habitually sees'
 completive, e.g.,  'to begin'  'he began'
 potential, e.g.,  'to close'  'he is going to close it'
 unfulfilled, e.g.,  'to finish'  'he didn't finish'
 incomplete, e.g.,  'to invite'  'he will invite'

The following example shows the aspectual inflection of three verbs in Mitla Zapotec.

Person marking

Person marking is shown with a set of post-verbal clitics, which are used for both subjects and objects

The following examples show examples of verbs with aspect and person marking

Syntax

The most basic word order is VSO.  However, SVO also occurs, especially with a topicalized subject.

References

 Briggs, Elinor. 1961. Mitla Zapotec grammar. Mexico City: Instituto Lingüístico de Verano and Centro de Investigaciones Antropológicas de México.
 Stubblefield, Morris and Carol Stubblefield. 1991. Diccionario Zapoteco de Mitla. Instituto Lingüístico de Verano, Mexico.
 Stubblefield, Morris & Carol Stubblefield, compilers. 1994. Mitla Zapotec texts. Dallas: Summer Institute of Linguistics.

External links 
OLAC resources in and about the Mitla Zapotec language

Zapotec languages